is a Japanese former professional footballer who played as a forward. He played for the Japan national team.

Club career
He was born on the island of Hokkaido and began his footballing career with JEF United Ichihara in 1994. He quickly established himself, scoring twelve goals in his first season; he scored his first goal on his debut against Gamba Osaka on 12 March.

After three seasons with JEF United Ichihara, Jo moved to the Yokohama Marinos (later Yokohama F. Marinos) in 1997. His performances in the 1998–99 season led to a loan move to the Spanish Primera División team Real Valladolid. He failed to make an impact with the club, making just 15 appearances and scoring two goals before sustaining a knee injury. After his return to Japan, Jo struggled to reestablish himself as a regular goal scorer with the Marinos and Vissel Kobe, with whom he joined in 2002. He joined Yokohama FC in 2003, where he scored 12 goals in his first season with them. He helped his club to become J2 Champions in 2006 gained and promotion to J1, but he retired from playing after that season.

International career
On 20 September 1995, Jo debuted for the Japan national team against Paraguay.

He made his first appearance in an international competition with the Japan U-23 national team in the 1996 Summer Olympics.

In October 1996, he played for the Japan senior team for the first time in a year. He also played at the 1996 Asian Cup in December. After the 1998 World Cup qualification in 1997 Japan qualified for the 1998 World Cup for the first time in their history. He played at the 1998 World Cup and the 1999 Copa América. He played all matches in both competitions. He played 35 games and scored 7 goals for Japan until 2001.

Career statistics

Club

International

Scores and results list Japan's goal tally first, score column indicates score after each Jo goal.

References

External links
 
 
 
 
 
 Japan National Football Team Database
 
 Soccer in Japan, Retrieved 11 October 2005
 FootballDatabase, Retrieved 11 October 2005

1975 births
Living people
People from Muroran, Hokkaido
Association football people from Hokkaido
Japanese footballers
Association football forwards
Japan international footballers
Olympic footballers of Japan
Footballers at the 1996 Summer Olympics
1996 AFC Asian Cup players
1998 FIFA World Cup players
1999 Copa América players
J1 League players
J2 League players
La Liga players
JEF United Chiba players
Yokohama F. Marinos players
Real Valladolid players
Vissel Kobe players
Yokohama FC players
Japanese expatriate footballers
Japanese expatriate sportspeople in Spain
Expatriate footballers in Spain